Bangladesh Last House is the last place of Bangladesh before the Bangladesh–India border at Jaintia Hill Resort, Tamabil, Sylhet District in Bangladesh. It has a view of two waterfalls with a mountain at Jaintia Hill Resort. It is a popular destination for tourism in Bangladesh, attracting thousands of visitors.

Gallery

References

External links

Satellite picture by Google Maps

Monuments and memorials in Bangladesh
Tourist attractions in Sylhet
Buildings and structures in Sylhet District
Architecture in Bangladesh